Ticsho (possibly from Quechua T'iksu, for inclination or motion to one side, obliqueness, slant,  Hispanicized spelling Ticsho) is a volcano in the Andes of Peru, about  high. It is situated in the "Valley of the Volcanoes"  in the Arequipa Region, Castilla Province, Andagua District. Ticsho lies south-west of the volcano Puca Mauras and west of the volcano Yanamauras.

References

Volcanoes of Peru
Mountains of Arequipa Region
Mountains of Peru
Landforms of Arequipa Region